Reluctant Nation is a Canadian historical docudrama television miniseries which aired on CBC Television in 1966.

Premise
This series was produced as a Canadian Centennial project, featuring dramatic portrayals of historical Canadian leaders who are interviewed in the format of contemporary television journalism. This public affairs style highlighted concerns which faced the early Canadian Confederation such as dealings with the United States and Europe, dealings among Canadian provinces and the role of francophones in the new nation.

John Saywell of York University was a series consultant.

Cast
 Arch McDonnell as a reporter
 Tom Harvey as a reporter
 Antony Parr as Andrew George Blair
 Claude Bede as William Stevens Fielding
 Jack Creley as Wilfrid Laurier
 Robert Christie as John A. Macdonald
 Robert Goodier as Honoré Mercier
 Paul Kligman as Oliver Mowat
 E. M. Margolese as John Norquay
 Norman Welsh as Goldwin Smith
 William Osler as William Van Horne

Scheduling
This half-hour series was broadcast on Thursdays at 10:30 p.m. (Eastern time) from 15 September to 20 October 1966.

References

External links
 
 

CBC Television original programming
1966 Canadian television series debuts
1966 Canadian television series endings
Canadian television docudramas